St. Augustine's High School (SAHS) is a Christian boys school which has resulted turned into a coed school in Vasai, Vasai-Virar, Maharashtra, India. The school has two grounds. The main ground is located at the back is one of the biggest grounds in Vasai. The campus consists of three buildings. The main building which can be seen from the main road is the high school building. Classes from 5th standard to 10th standard are held over here. To the right of the building is the primary section. Just beside the main field is the residence of the Christian brothers. A statue of Edmund Ignatius Rice is located on the site.

History
St Augustine's High School was started in 1972 by the Christian Brothers Association of India, Indian arm of the Congregation of Christian Brothers. It achieved 100% results of standard 10th each year. It was visited by Pope John Paul II on February 9, 1986, when he held a prayer meeting on the grounds of the school

Location
It is located in Vasai taluka in the Palghar district of Maharashtra.

External links
http://www.vasaitaluka.in/school.aspx
http://www.indianexpress.com/res/web/pIe/ie/daily/19981111/31550534.html
http://network.edmundrice.eu/

Congregation of Christian Brothers secondary schools
Catholic secondary schools in India
Boys' schools in India
Primary schools in India
High schools and secondary schools in Maharashtra
Christian schools in Maharashtra
Education in Vasai-Virar
Educational institutions established in 1970
1970 establishments in Maharashtra